Stann Creek District is a district in the south east region of Belize. According to the 2010 census, the district had a population of 32,166 people. Its capital is the town of Dangriga, formerly known as "Stann Creek Town." Stann comes from "stanns," or safe havens used by colonialists coming from the "old world" to the "new world."

Geography 

Located within the district are the port of Big Creek (the main port of Belize's banana industry), the peninsula and village of Placencia (a popular tourist destination), the villages of Santa Cruz, Alta Vista, Georgetown, Independence, Kendal, Maya Mopan, Middlesex, Mullins River, Pomona, Red Bank, Sarawee, Silk Grass, San Roman, Sittee River and the Garifuna village of Hopkins.

Political divisions 
The district is split into two constituencies. They are Dangriga, which contains the town proper and two villages (including Hope Creek and Sarawee) and the offshore islands (cayes), and Stann Creek West, which contains most of the remaining villages including Santa Cruz, Placencia and Independence.

Transportation 
The district is served by the Hummingbird Highway and the Thomas Vincent Ramos Highway, connecting to Belize City by way of the George Price Highway at Belmopan.

Language 
Mostly used language in Stann Creek is English, with the main town of Dangriga having a mix of English and Garifuna, since the majority of the residents are Garifuna.

Attractions 
The Stann Creek District is also home to the Cockscomb Basin Wildlife Sanctuary where South Stann Creek rises. The ethnic Garifuna village of Hopkins has recently undergone a huge transformation due to the growing tourism industry. Placencia is home to one of Belize's most popular tourist destinations due to its large selection of resorts, guest houses, hotels and white sandy beaches. The Garifuna are direct descendants of a group of African slaves who escaped two ship-wrecked Spanish slave ships near St. Vincent in 1635. They celebrate a diverse and rich culture that is a blend of African traditions of music, dance and religious ceremonies; Native American farming, hunting, and fishing techniques; and a French and Arawak influenced language.

See also
Wee Wee Caye Marine Lab

References

External links 
 Map
 Stann Creek District at belize.fm
 Stann Creek Real Estate

 
Districts of Belize